Wacław Orłowski (born 5 January 1945) is a Polish wrestler. He competed in the men's Greco-Roman 97 kg at the 1968 Summer Olympics.

References

1945 births
Living people
Polish male sport wrestlers
Olympic wrestlers of Poland
Wrestlers at the 1968 Summer Olympics
People from Braunau am Inn